"By Yourself" is a song by American singers Ty Dolla Sign featuring fellow American singer Jhené Aiko and American record producer Mustard. The song was sent to rhythmic contemporary radio as the fourth single from the former's third studio album, Featuring Ty Dolla Sign (2020), on February 2, 2021. However, it was origi

nally released as a promotional single from the album on October 16, 2020. It was produced by Mustard and GYLTTRYP. The two wrote the song with the artists alongside Melvin Moore and Nye Lee, Jr. Mustard is also featured alongside American rapper Roddy Ricch on the song "Real Life" from the album, and contributes production to that song, as well as "Everywhere". A remix also featuring Bryson Tiller was released on March 19, 2021, with a music video released a month later on April 28.

Background
Ty Dolla Sign spoke about his collaboration with Jhené Aiko and Mustard and explained the idea of the song:One of my favorite parts of making this album was getting back in with my brother Mustard and just making hits after hits, like we've been doing for the past decade. The song needed the frequency of a strong woman, so I had to call my sis Jhené who came in and killed it like only she can do. "By Yourself" is an ode to all the amazing women, especially all the single women and the single mothers, who do this thing called life on their own. Especially now more than ever. Ladies if you're handling your responsibilities by yourself, just know we see you and appreciate you.

Composition
Floating over the production of the song, Ty Dolla Sign and Jhené Aiko's vocals blend in together. According to Wongo Okon of Uproxx, Ty Dolla Sign "takes a moment to praise the Miss Independents in his life and commends the women who push through life and take care of their needs by themselves" and Jhené Aiko "steps through with a verse of her own showing that she's an example of a woman who does it by herself".

Live performances
Ty Dolla Sign and Jhené Aiko performed the song live on The Late Show with Stephen Colbert on October 20, 2020. This performance was held only a few hours before the former released the single "Spicy", featuring Post Malone, as the third single of his album, Featuring Ty Dolla Sign.

Charts

References

2021 songs
2021 singles
Ty Dolla Sign songs
Jhené Aiko songs
Mustard (record producer) songs
Atlantic Records singles
Songs written by Ty Dolla Sign
Songs written by Jhené Aiko
Songs written by Mustard (record producer)
Song recordings produced by Mustard (record producer)